Matsuura (written: 松浦) is a Japanese surname. Notable people with the surname include:

Akiko Matsuura, Japanese drummer
Atsushi Matsuura (footballer born 1982), former Japanese football player
Atsushi Matsuura (footballer born 1981), former Japanese football player
Atsushi Matsuura (musician) (born 1968), Japanese guitarist
Aya Matsuura (born 1986), Japanese singer and actress
Daigo Matsuura (born 1969), Japanese politician
David Matsuura (19632020), American politician
Eleanor Matsuura, actress
Frank S. Matsura (1873-1913), early twentieth-century Japanese photographer (birth name Sakae Matsuura)
Hiroko Matsuura (born 1990), Japanese volleyball player
Hiromi Matsuura (born 1984), Japanese singer and AV idol
, Japanese ice hockey player
, Japanese ice hockey player
Junrokurō Matsuura (1884-1944), lieutenant general in the Imperial Japanese Army in the Second Sino-Japanese War
Kōichirō Matsuura (born 1937), Japanese public servant and current Director-General of UNESCO
Kosuke Matsuura (born 1979), Japanese race car driver
Masaya Matsuura (born 1961), Japanese video game designer and musician
Max Matsuura (born 1964), Japanese record producer and president of Avex Trax
Richard Matsuura (1933  1997), American politician
Shinji Matsuura, a Japanese badminton player
, Japanese explorer, cartographer, writer, painter, priest and antiquarian
Takuya Matsuura (born 1988), Japanese football player
Tokihiko Matsuura (born 1968), Japanese manga artist
Toshio Matsuura (born 1955), former Japanese football player and manager

Fictional characters 
Yuu Matsuura, protagonist and title character of the Marmalade Boy manga and anime series
Kanan Matsuura, a character from Love Live! Sunshine!!

See also
Hereditary lords of the Matsura clan of Hirado
Matsura Akira (1840-1908), the 12th and final daimyō of the Hirado Domain in Hizen Province, Kyūshū, Japan
Matsura Hisanobu (1571-1602), daimyō of the late Azuchi-Momoyama period through early Edo period
Matsura Seizan (1760-1841), daimyō and famed swordsman during the late Edo period of Japan
Matsura Takanobu (1529-1599), 16th-century Japanese samurai and 25th hereditary lord of the Matsuura clan of Hirado
Matsura Takanobu (1592–1637), daimyō of the Hirado Domain

Japanese-language surnames